Franklyn Field (born March 30, 1923) is an American television personality and meteorologist who was on TV in New York City for five decades, reporting not only on the weather but also on science and health topics. He was instrumental in publicizing the Heimlich Maneuver to aid food choking victims. Field carries the Seal of Approval of the American Meteorological Society.

Field was a resident of Montclair, New Jersey, before retiring to Boca Raton, Florida.

Life and career
Field is of Ashkenazi Jewish heritage. The original family name was "Feld", which is German for "field". It was changed to Field to Americanize his last name. His parents emigrated to America in 1909; his extended family that remained in Europe perished during the Holocaust. Field returned on assignment from WCBS to search for remnants of his family and produced a one-hour special Journey of the Heart, which included an emotional interview with Elie Wiesel.

He was a first lieutenant and meteorologist with the 8th Air Force during World War II in the European Theater. His meteorological training was at Brown University and the Massachusetts Institute of Technology. Field holds a B.A. in geology from Brooklyn College, a B.S. in optometry from Columbia University, and an O.D. degree from the Massachusetts College of Optometry. He was on the faculty of the Albert Einstein College of Medicine in the Department of Preventive and Environmental Medicine. 

Field began his career in 1958 at WRCA-TV – which became WNBC-TV in 1960 – remaining there for over 25 years. He was friends with Johnny Carson and was a frequent guest on The Tonight Show. On August 12, 1984, Field moved to rival WCBS-TV, where he worked for 11 years. Later, he moved to WNYW-TV for two years before ending his weather forecaster career at WWOR-TV. 

Field was noted for his science reports on new technology and medicines. In the 1970s and 1980s, he hosted a nationally syndicated program on health originating from WNBC, called Health Field, and anchored a similar health news program on WLNY for the North Shore Long Island Jewish Health System, called Medical Update. He also did a documentary called Plan To Get Out Alive where he used a simulated house fire to show viewers how to survive that catastrophe. He won a local Emmy Award for his work. Dr. Field has now been replaced from Medical Update to retire in Florida.

Family
Field's son, Storm Field (b. 1948) was a meteorologist as well, following his father into weather forecasting. Storm Field joined WABC-TV in 1976 and became the station's chief weather forecaster shortly thereafter, staying on until 1991. Storm would join his father at WCBS the next year, with a humorous ad campaign employed by the station using puns and plays on both Frank and Storm Field's names. Storm Field eventually took over the chief meteorologist's role that his father held before him. He left in 1997 to become chief meteorologist at WWOR-TV where he again got a chance to work with his father. Storm Field presented a special in 2003 that highlighted his father's career. 

Field's daughter, Allison, was a meteorologist for WCBS-TV. She also appeared in a few movies, playing reporters or newscasters.

Notes

External links

1923 births
Living people
Jewish American military personnel
United States Army Air Forces personnel of World War II
Weather presenters
Television meteorologists in New York City
Television anchors from New York City
People from Boca Raton, Florida
People from Montclair, New Jersey
Brooklyn College alumni
Brown University alumni
Massachusetts Institute of Technology alumni
Columbia University alumni
Yeshiva University faculty
Scientists from New York (state)
American people of German-Jewish descent
United States Army Air Forces officers
21st-century American Jews
Military personnel from New Jersey